Aleksey Aleksandrovich Bortkov (Алексей Александрович Бортков, born  in Irkutsk) is a Russian weightlifter. He competed in the 62 kg category and represented Russia at international competitions. He participated at the 2000 Summer Olympics in the 62 kg event.

Major results

References

External links
 

1976 births
Living people
Russian male weightlifters
Weightlifters at the 2000 Summer Olympics
Olympic weightlifters of Russia
Sportspeople from Irkutsk
20th-century Russian people
21st-century Russian people